Labyrinth is a soundtrack album by David Bowie and composer Trevor Jones, released in 1986 for the film Labyrinth. It was the second of three soundtrack releases in which Bowie had a major role, following Christiane F. (1981) and preceding The Buddha of Suburbia (1993). The soundtrack album features Jones' score, which is split into six tracks for the soundtrack: "Into the Labyrinth", "Sarah", "Hallucination", "The Goblin Battle", "Thirteen O'Clock", and "Home at Last".

Background
Director Jim Henson approached Bowie to take part in the film in 1983 during Bowie's Serious Moonlight Tour, when he showed Bowie early designs for the movie and a tape of The Dark Crystal (1982). Bowie had wanted to make music for a children's film and saw this as his chance.
Bowie recorded five songs for the film: "Underground", "Magic Dance", "Chilly Down", "As the World Falls Down", and "Within You". The film's theme song, "Underground", features on the soundtrack twice, first in an edited version that was played over the film's opening sequence and secondly in full. The only song Bowie did not the perform lead vocals on is "Chilly Down", which was performed by Charles Augins, Richard Bodkin, Kevin Clash, and Danny John-Jules, the actors who voiced the 'Fire Gang' creatures in the film.

Release
The soundtrack album was released in July 1986 to coincide with the film's US premiere. "Underground" was released in various territories as a single in June 1986, and in certain markets was also released in an instrumental version and an extended dance mix. In January 1987 "Magic Dance" was released as a 12" single in limited markets, including the US. "As the World Falls Down" was initially slated for release as a follow-up single to "Underground" at Christmas in 1986, but this plan did not materialize. 

In 2017, the album was remastered and reissued on vinyl by Capitol Records, with a replication of the original jacket and artwork, including the original release's EMI America logo and inner sleeve featuring photos of Bowie from the film. A second pressing the same year also included limited runs of green and lavender coloured vinyl.

Promotion
The soundtrack was advertised in music trade papers such as Billboard. Steve Barron produced promotional music videos for "Underground" and "As the World Falls Down". The music video for "Underground" features Bowie as a nightclub singer who stumbles upon the world of the Labyrinth, encountering many of the creatures seen in the film. The clip for "As the World Falls Down" integrates clips from the film, using them alongside black-and-white shots of Bowie performing the song in an elegant room.

Though Bowie was not heavily involved in promoting Labyrinth, Jim Henson was nonetheless grateful that he had made the promotional music videos, saying, "I think it's the best thing he could have done for the film." Barron's videos for "As the World Falls Down" and "Underground" so impressed Henson that he recruited Barron to direct his television series The StoryTeller.

Critical reception

Upon release in 1986, Labyrinth reached #68 on the Billboard 200 chart in the United States and #38 on the United Kingdom's Official Albums Chart. The album re-entered the Official Albums Chart in 2017, peaking at #58. According to biographer David Buckley in 2015, the Labyrinth soundtrack was Bowie's third-best selling iTunes album in the United Kingdom. 

Adam Trainer in Senses of Cinema described Bowie's five songs as "spirited and imaginative ... presenting satisfying melodies and singalong choruses" such as that of "Magic Dance". However, while writing that the songs work well within the context of the film, "echoing its plotline and themes such as imagination, fun and fantasy", Trainer considered the songs to be over-produced and too "self-consciously pop". Sean Stangland of the Daily Herald wrote "The five songs [Bowie] wrote for the film are as confoundingly diverse as the rest of his career." Calling the soundtrack "absolutely stellar", Screen Rant described Bowie's Labyrinth songs as "absolute earworms that contribute to his legacy just as much as Ziggy Stardust and all the rest."

The Labyrinth soundtrack has been included on lists of the top 50 movie soundtracks by Paste magazine and Gigwise. MovieWeb ranked Labyrinth number one on its list of the best film soundtracks of the 1980s.

Track listing

Personnel
Credits per biographer Nicholas Pegg.

Musicians

 David Bowie – vocals, backing vocals, producer
 Arif Mardin – producer
 Trevor Jones – keyboards, producer
 Ray Russell – lead guitar
 Albert Collins – guitar
 Dann Huff – guitar
 Paul Westwood – bass guitar
 Will Lee – bass guitar
 Matthew Seligman – bass guitar
 Neil Conti – drums
 Steve Ferrone – drums
 Robbie Buchanan – keyboards, synthesizer
 Brian Gascoigne – keyboards
 David Lawson – keyboards
 Ray Warleigh – saxophone
 Bob Gay - saxophone
 Maurice Murphy – trumpet
 Robin Beck – backing vocals
 Chaka Khan – backing vocals
 Cissy Houston – backing vocals
 Danny John-Jules – backing vocals
 Fonzi Thornton – backing vocals
 Luther Vandross – backing vocals

Charts

Notes

References

Bibliography

External links
 

Labyrinth (1986 film)
Albums produced by David Bowie
Albums produced by Arif Mardin
David Bowie soundtracks
1986 soundtrack albums
Fantasy film soundtracks
EMI Records soundtracks
New wave soundtracks
Pop rock soundtracks

it:Labyrinth#Musica